The Irish Voice is a newspaper published in New York City, New York. It focuses on news and stories from an Irish-American perspective. The paper was first published in the fall of 1987 and was targeted at new Irish immigrants who were moving to the US in large numbers.

Origins
The paper was founded by Niall O'Dowd in 1987. Circulation of the paper was claimed to be 65,000 in 2007.

The Irish Voice is very closely linked with the Irish Central website. Most of the newspaper articles are available from the site.

See also
Irish America

References

External links
The Irish Voice Online

Irish-American culture in New York City
Newspapers published in New York City